The East Rail line Metro Cammell EMU (also known as Mid-Life Refurbishment Train, ; or MLR Train) was a model of electric multiple unit built in 1980–1990 by Metro-Cammell for the original Kowloon–Canton Railway (now the East Rail line) in Hong Kong. The 29 sets were owned by and were originally operated by the Kowloon-Canton Railway Corporation (KCRC). They were operated by MTR Corporation (MTRC) after it merged with KCRC in 2007. Although another set of EMU trains from the same manufacturer operate on some of MTR's own lines, there are some significant differences between the two models, with the Metro Cammell EMUs of the original MTR being known as the Modernization Train.

The trains were delivered in several phases. The different phases of this series of train have entitled with different model numbers, including: 3094 stock, K01 stock, K03 stock and K05 stock. Regardless, all model numbers have an identical appearance. After the rail merger, the KCR logos on the MLR trains were replaced with those of MTR, and a revised route map was introduced in the train interiors. Skirts were also added to all carriages, but the pantograph cars had their skirts removed due to heating issues. The interior floor was also changed for a darker blue in between two red aesthetics, and a brighter blue in between two windows.

Since the 2007 merger, the MLR was the second oldest variation of EMU operating on the MTR network, behind the M-Trains from 1979. It was also the only electric multiple unit of the Mass Transit Railway that did not have regenerative braking, as noted due to the lack of motor sound and the presence of air brake sounds while braking. All were retired on 6 May 2022, on the 40th anniversary of the electrification of the East Rail Line, with the Hyundai Rotem EMUs replacing them prior to the opening of the extension of the East Rail line to Admiralty station. It is the first type of electric train in Hong Kong to be scrapped from service.

History 

The trains were ordered during the electrification of the KCR British section, now known as MTR East Rail line, in 1978. Sets E1-E45 and E46-E61 were delivered to KCRC in 2 batches in 1982–1983, when electrification was completed first between Hung Hom and Sha Tin in May 1982, and from then to Tai Po Market station before Lo Wu on 16 August 1983. KCRC also reordered further train sets in 1986 (sets E62-E86) and 1990 (sets E87-E118). In the early days of full electrification, these trains sometimes suffered from a temporary loss of electricity while passing University Station because of neutral sections (or dead zones), which was due to the lack of internal batteries.

The exteriors of the trains before refurbishment featured a red stripe running down the length of the trains, and yellow driving cabs located on the first and last cars. Due to the aforementioned colour of the cab, the trains was commonly referred to as the "Yellow-heads".

The trains were initially operated with 3 cars, they were subsequently extended to 6, 9 and 12 cars to cope with increasing ridership. Trains were inconsistent in terms of length, ranging from 3 to 12 cars. By 1992, all trains were formed of 12 cars.

Refurbishment 
Like the DC MTR Metro Cammell EMUs, the KCR Metro Cammell EMUs underwent a major refurbishment from 1996 to 1999 to extend their lifespan, carried out by the successor of Metro-Cammell, Alstom (then known as GEC Alsthom). This reflected the significant role change of the KCR's British section, because of the development of new towns within the New Territories.

The trains were converted to fixed 12-car sets and received a new exterior livery of blue and silverish bodies with red doors; they were reassembled into either a 3+3+6 configuration (3xx 2xx 6xx 4xx 2xx 6xx 6xx 2xx 5xx 5xx 2xx 1xx) or a 3+3+3+3 configuration (3xx 2xx 6xx 4xx 2xx 6xx 5xx 2xx 6xx 5xx 2xx 1xx). The driving trailers also received rebuilt front ends, which did not feature an emergency escape door; and the unnecessary intermediate driving cabs were replaced by standard body ends. The doors were also increased from three doors per side to five doors per car side, replacing some doors with electric doors from the pneumatic ones used on the M-Stock. This was done by removing two windows on both sides, excluding the First Class cars, which have two doors per side. The Interior refurbishments included the replacement of transverse seating by longitudinal bench seats to create more space for standing passengers, although transverse seating was retained in First Class. Also included was changing the ceiling to a rounder one to create a more modern feel. The freight compartment between the driving cab and First Class compartment was removed along with its doors, and was replaced by the windows from the standard class carriages, with the new gangway connections being installed, and together with intermediate driving compartments, toilets(removed in late 1980s) and gangway doors being removed, but retained for First Class carriages. The trains also received new passenger information systems, including multi-colour LED signs displaying train destination, the next station, safety guidelines, and the time and temperature. Included in the refurbishment was changing the colours to teal and a touch of red, with a fire resistant floor, along with installation of emergency stairs for passengers to safely disembark to the trackside, and the installation of 22-inch LCD screens mounted above windows, broadcasting looping daily TV news provided by Cable TV Hong Kong (Newsline Express) and advertisements. The safety systems were changed to TBL (enhanced with ATP) from AWS in 1998 and ATC/ATO in 2002.

The only non-refurbished unit was E44 (144-244-444). E44 was not refurbished since it was the only unit left over after all other units were formed into 12 car trains. It is currently stored at Ho Tung Lau Depot, awaiting an uncertain future.

Fleet

Configuration of an East Rail line Metro Cammell EMU is as follows: (southbound) 1xx-2xx-5xx+6xx-2xx-5xx+6xx-2xx-4xx+6xx-2xx-3xx (northbound), or (southbound) 1xx-2xx-5xx-5xx-2xx-6xx+6xx-2xx-4xx+6xx-2xx-3xx (northbound).

Accidents and incidents

Train accidents

1984 Sheung Shui crash incident 
On 25 November 1984, an East Rail Metro Cammell EMU train derailed between Sheung Shui and Lo Wu station. The incident occurred when the driver, preparing to back the train up to Sheung Shui station, failed to follow a speed/stop signal while the train was exceeding the speed limit. The train crashed into a boulder buffer with the first two cars piling on top of each other. The degree of damage was so extensive that the cars never returned to service. Passengers were unloaded prior to the crash while the driver sustained only minor injuries. However, the accident caused train services to be suspended for the rest of the day and the incident spurred a series of public outcries concerning railway safety. Set E45 (which was 233-234-235) was hence commissioned as a result of the accident to replace the damaged cars.

The depot accident on 1987 included the only remaining coach no. 233 on E45, and coach no. 272 on E58. 233 took over the crashed 272 on E58 and became the current 458 in the late 90s, which has been retired in 2022 April. After then, the whole set E45 was scrapped in the 90s, and a 1:1 yellow head model was reconstructed until it made room for the retired locomotive 51.

2019 East Rail line derailment 
On 17 September 2019, a 12-car Metro Cammell EMU train(E81/E21) servicing the East Rail line derailed while approaching Hung Hom station. Services between Hung Hom station and Mong Kok East station and the Intercity Through Train were cancelled for several days. Eight passengers were injured during the derailing. The derailment was attributed to deteriorated sleepers widening the track gauge. 4 cars were scrapped (including First Class) and 4 other cars from E92/E70 were repaired and used for the derailment train.

Underframe cracking 
On 21 December 2005, an East Rail Metro Cammell EMU train failed while in operation. Following examination of the train, KCRC staff detected minor cracks in the welding of mounting brackets for some underframe components. A review panel commissioned by KCRC looked into the problem from four aspects:
 the rate of change of the acceleration and deceleration of trains
 the welding of components' mounting brackets
 the profile of the track and train wheels
 suspension system

Since the full introduction of Automatic train operation (ATO) on the East Rail system in 2002, the rate of change of acceleration and deceleration resulting from ATO driving added stress to the underframe components. To allow a root cause investigation to be carried out, the use of the ATO system was suspended on 15 January 2006, leaving the operation of trains back in the hands of the train drivers, the safety of train operation under the control of the Automatic Train Protection system. This resulted in a decreased frequency (from 24 to 23 trains per hour) and lengthened trip time (increase by 90 seconds to 42.5 minutes). KCRC also temporarily transferred some staff from West Rail to cope with recent maintenance of trains.

The Environment, Transport and Works Bureau reprimanded the KCRC for not immediately notifying the Government when it found problems with its East Rail trains in 2005. Secretary for the Bureau Dr Sarah Liao said she has ordered the KCRC to inspect all its trains, and did not rule out suspending services if there are safety doubts. Dr Liao ordered the chairman to review the corporation's operations, including its management and overall system, and submit a report. KCRC chairman Michael Tien accepted responsibility for the corporation's poor judgement in not sharing the information with the public in a timely matter.

On 21 January 2006, Michael Tien stated that the safety problems of East Rail had been controlled, and the train service was expected to operate as usual, including train service in the Chinese New Year. KCRC East Rail trains reverted to ATO operation on 6 August 2006, after the investigation confirmed that the ATO system is not a direct cause of the cracking.

Replacement

All 29 MLR sets had been gradually retired from service starting in 2021 (E92/E70 was scrapped in 2020) and, together with the newer SP1900 EMUs built by Kinki Sharyo, were replaced by brand-new Hyundai Rotem EMU trains ordered in December 2012. These 43 9-car "R-Trains" are manufactured by the same company as the K-Stock operating on the Tung Chung line and the Tseung Kwan O line. The MLR was officially retired on 6 May 2022, with the last train leaving Hung Hom at 13:00, formed of train set E112-E71, ending its 40 years of services.

Other details

Preserved examples 
A 1:1 scale model was once on display at the Hong Kong Railway Museum, built from components of carriage 272 of set E58. The model has since been scrapped to make room for Locomotive 51.

Scrapped units and surplus cars
E45 (which was 233-234-235) was supposed to be 145-245-445. After the incident, the only remaining coach was coach no. 233. Coach 233 replaced the crashed 272 in E58 and officially became coach no. 272, and then 458. Due to the extensive damage, coaches 234 and 235 were wrecked in the 1984 accident in a siding, and the only remaining historical train was E44 (144-244-444) and 445 (now stored somewhere at Ho Tung Lau Depot) If these were not involved, 144 and 145 would have become 644 and 645.

Gallery

References

External links 

 East Rail Rolling Stock – Hong Kong Railway Information Centre (fan site)
 1980s Metro-Cammell Products – Metcam.co.uk (dedicative site)
  – [5] acceleration

MTR rolling stock
Metropolitan Cammell multiple units
Electric multiple units of Great Britain
Electric multiple units of Hong Kong
25 kV AC multiple units
2022 disestablishments in Hong Kong